Magnesium glycinate, also known as magnesium diglycinate or magnesium bisglycinate, is the magnesium salt of glycine (one magnesium and two glycine molecules), and is sold as a dietary supplement. It contains 14.1% elemental magnesium by mass. Accordingly, 141 mg of elemental magnesium is contained in 1000 mg of magnesium glycinate.

Uses
Magnesium glycinate has been studied with applicability to patients with a bowel resection or pregnancy-induced leg cramps.

See also
 Magnesium (pharmaceutical preparation)
 Magnesium deficiency (medicine)
 Magnesium in biology

References

Magnesium compounds
Glycinates
Dietary supplements